Nikita Sergeyevich Zhustyev (born 23 November 2002) is a Russian football player who plays for FC Irtysh Omsk.

Club career
He made his debut in the Russian Football National League for FC Irtysh Omsk on 5 September 2020 in a game against FC Neftekhimik Nizhnekamsk.

References

External links
 
 Profile by Russian Football National League
 

2002 births
Sportspeople from Omsk
Living people
Russian footballers
Association football forwards
FC Irtysh Omsk players